Earl Jude Jean (born 9 October 1971) is a Saint Lucian former footballer who played as a striker. He made 21 appearances in the Primeira Divisão for Felgueiras, 84 in the Football League for Ipswich Town, Rotherham United and Plymouth Argyle, and five in the Scottish Premier League for Hibernian. Jean played for Saint Lucia at full international level.

Career

Ipswich
Earl famously told the local media that despite his short stature he could leap very high - he was therefore nicknamed 'The Flea'. In December 1996 he made his only appearance for Ipswich Town, coming on as a substitute in a 1–1 home draw against Stoke City.

Rotherham
He was leading scorer for Rotherham United F.C. during the 1996–97 season, prior to moving to Plymouth Argyle F.C. in 1997.

International career
He was a member of the Saint Lucia national team from 1992  to 2004.

International goals 
Scores and results list Saint Lucia's goal tally first, score column indicates score after each Jean goal.

Coaching career
After his retirement in December 2009 began his coaching career as Assistant coach of his former Saint Lucia national team Head coach Stuart Charles Fevrier by W Connection.

References

External links

1971 births
Living people
Association football forwards
Saint Lucian footballers
Saint Lucia international footballers
Ipswich Town F.C. players
Rotherham United F.C. players
Plymouth Argyle F.C. players
Hibernian F.C. players
Saint Lucian expatriate footballers
Expatriate footballers in England
Expatriate footballers in Scotland
Expatriate footballers in Portugal
TT Pro League players
TT Pro League managers
English Football League players
Scottish Premier League players
San Juan Jabloteh F.C. players
U.D. Oliveirense players
Leça F.C. players
C.F. União de Coimbra players
W Connection F.C. players
Expatriate footballers in China
Expatriate footballers in Trinidad and Tobago
Saint Lucian expatriate sportspeople in Trinidad and Tobago
Saint Lucian expatriate sportspeople in England
Saint Lucian expatriate sportspeople in Scotland
Saint Lucian expatriate sportspeople in Portugal
People from Castries Quarter
San Juan Jabloteh F.C. managers
Saint Lucian football managers